Aleixo Clemente Messias Gomes (Panjim, Goa, 11 January 1873 - Panjim, 27 June 1957), better known as Prof. Messias Gomes, was a secondary school teacher, writer and Portuguese-Goan journalist, author of several works on historical themes and founder of the daily O Heraldo  (which appeared on 22 January 1900), the first daily to be published in Portuguese India.

Works 
 O reino de Chandrapur: Uma investigação archeologica, Bastorá, Tipografia Rangel, 1896.

References

19th-century Portuguese writers
19th-century Indian male writers
20th-century Portuguese writers
Journalists from Goa
1873 births
1957 deaths
People from Panaji
20th-century Indian journalists
19th-century Indian journalists